Ulyanovka is an urban locality (an urban-type settlement) in Tosnensky District of Leningrad Oblast, Russia, located approximately  southeast of the center of Saint Petersburg. Municipally it is incorporated as Ulyanovskoye Urban Settlement, one of the seven urban settlements in the district. Population:

History

Until 1922, the name of Ulyanovka was Sablino. In the 1900s, Sablino was a summer house settlement, a part of Tsarskoselsky Uyezd of Saint Petersburg Governorate. In 1918, Sablino split off Tosnenskaya Volost and became the center of Sablinskaya Volost. On November 20, 1918 the uyezd was renamed Detskoselsky. Sablino was renamed Ulyanovka in 1922 after Vladimir Lenin whose original surname was Ulyanov. On August 12, 1922 Detskoselsky Uyezd was merged with Petergofsky Uyezd to form Gatchinsky Uyezd (since 1923, Trotsky Uyezd). On June 16, 1925 Ulyanovka was granted urban-type settlement status. On February 7, 1927, it was transferred to Leningradsky Uyezd. The governorate was renamed Petrogradsky in 1913 and Leningradsky in 1924.

On August 1, 1927, the uyezds were abolished and Kolpinsky District, with the administrative center in the town of Kolpino, was established. The governorates were also abolished, and the district was a part of Leningrad Okrug of Leningrad Oblast. Ulyanovka became a part of Kolpinsky District. On July 23, 1930, the okrugs were abolished as well, and the districts were directly subordinated to the oblast. On August 19, 1930 the district was abolished. Ulyanovka became a part of newly established Tosnensky District.

Economy

Industry
In Ulyanovka, there is a plant producing aluminium tubes and a plant producing block timber homes.

Transportation
Ulyanovka (Sablino railway station) is an important railway node, a crossing of the Moscow – Saint Petersburg Railway and the railroad between Mga and Gatchina, encircling Saint Peterburg from the south.

The M10 highway, connecting Saint Petersburg and Moscow, passes west of Ulyanovka, and the A120 road, which encircles Saint Petersburg, passes east and south of the settlement. Ulyanovka is additionally connected by a road with Otradnoye via Nikolskoye.

Culture and recreation
Ulyanovka contains two objects classified as cultural and historical heritage of federal significance and one designated as a historical monument of local significance. The federal monuments are the houses (formerly summer houses) visited by Vladimir Lenin; one of them was owned by his sister, Anna Ulyanova. The local monument is a mass grave of soldiers fallen during World War II.

References

Notes

Sources

Urban-type settlements in Leningrad Oblast
Tsarskoselsky Uyezd